Nicolas Vilant FRSE (1737-1807) was a mathematician from Scotland in the 18th century, known for his textbooks. He was a joint founder of the Royal Society of Edinburgh in 1783.

Life
He was baptised in Ferryport-on-Tay (now called Tayport) on 12 June 1737, the son of Rev William Vilant, the local minister (but of French descent), and his second wife, Jean Wilson. He studied Mathematics at St Andrews University from 1752 under Prof David Gregory.

Vilant was Regius Professor of Mathematics in the University of Saint Andrews from 1765 to his death in 1807. Often ill, he was unable to teach most of this time, and lectures were given by assistants, among them John West. Under Newtonian tradition, he was unable to follow the continental developments in mathematical analysis, like most of his British contemporaries.

He died in St Andrews on 25 May 1807.

Family

He married Elizabeth Brand around 1770. Two of their sons attended St Andrews University.

Publications

He was a good mathematician, and his textbooks were very popular until the first years of the 19th century. The most renowned was The Elements of Mathematical Analysis, Abridged for the Use of Students, first printed in 1777 and used as a university textbook from 1783, reprinted for student use.

There are many manuscripts conserved in the archives of the University of Saint Andrews.

References

Bibliography

External links 
 

1737 births
1807 deaths
18th-century Scottish people
18th-century Scottish mathematicians
People from Tayport
Alumni of the University of St Andrews
Academics of the University of St Andrews
Fellows of the Royal Society of Edinburgh